The 1998–99 Primeira Divisão was the 65th edition of top flight of Portuguese football. It started on 23 August 1998 with a match between Chaves and Académica Coimbra, and ended on 30 May 1999. The league was contested by 18 clubs with Porto as the defending champions.

Porto won the league and qualified for the 1999–2000 UEFA Champions League group stage, along with Boavista, who qualified for the third round. With the extinction of the UEFA Cup Winners' Cup, the Taça de Portugal winner qualified for the UEFA Cup, so Beira-Mar joined Benfica, Sporting CP and Vitória de Setúbal in the 1999-2000 UEFA Cup; in opposite, Beira-Mar, Chaves and Académica Coimbra were relegated to the Liga de Honra. Mário Jardel  was the top scorer with 36 goals.

Promotion and relegation

Teams relegated to Liga de Honra
Leça
Varzim
Belenenses

Leça, Varzim and Belenenses, were consigned to the Liga de Honra following their final classification in 1997–98 season.

Teams promoted from Liga de Honra
União de Leiria
Beira-Mar
Alverca

The other three teams were replaced by União de Leiria, Beira-Mar, Alverca from the Liga de Honra.

Teams

Stadia and locations

Managerial changes

League table

Results

Top goalscorers

Source: Footballzz

See also 
 1998–99 in Portuguese football

References

External links
 Portugal 1998-99 - RSSSF (Jorge Miguel Teixeira)
 Portuguese League 1998/99 - footballzz.co.uk
 Portugal - Table of Honor - Soccer Library 
 Portuguese Wikipedia - Campeonato Português de Futebol - I Divisão 1998/1999

Primeira Liga seasons
Portugal Primeira
Primeira Divisão